KBTS (94.3 FM, "The Fuse") is a radio station licensed to serve Big Spring, Texas, United States. The station is currently owned by Kbest Media, LLC.

KBTS broadcasts a hot adult contemporary music format to the greater Big Spring-Snyder, Texas, area.

The station was assigned the KBTS call sign by the Federal Communications Commission on August 6, 1993.

References

External links

BTS
Hot adult contemporary radio stations in the United States